The 2008 Pacific Islanders rugby union tour of Europe was a series of test matches played by the Pacific Islanders team in England, France, and Italy during November 2008.

The team lost the first two test matches against England and France, but won the final test against Italy.

The head coach for the tour was former Tongan player Quddus Fielea, after Ilivasi Tabua withdrew from the tour. The captain for the tour was Fijian Mosese Rauluni while the vice-captain was Tongan Nili Latu.

Squad

Two further players were originally included in the squad Sireli Bobo and Soane Tonga'uiha. However Bobo became unavailable, and Tonga'uiha later withdrew from the tour.

Results

England

France

Italy

See also 
 2008 end-of-year rugby union tests

2008 rugby union tours
2008
2008 in Oceanian rugby union
2008–09 in European rugby union
2008–09 in English rugby union
2008–09 in French rugby union
2008–09 in Italian rugby union
2008
2008
2008
2008